Sass Jordan (c. 1962) is a British-born Canadian rock singer from Montreal, Quebec. Her first single, "Tell Somebody," from her debut album of the same name won the Juno Award for Most Promising Female Vocalist in 1989. Since then, she has been nominated three more times for Juno Awards. Her album Rebel Moon Blues hit #5 on the Billboard Blues chart.

Early life

Sass Jordan was born in 1962, in Birmingham, England to French-born literary professor Albert Jordan and former ballerina Jean Lanceman. When Jordan was three years old, her dad moved them from France to Montreal for a position as a professor at Concordia University.

Jordan was first inspired to pursue music after hearing The Band's 1969 track "The Night They Drove Old Dixie Down" on the radio. Jordan's parents only had classical music in the house, and she has described hearing The Band on the radio as a "revelation." She has cited Rod Stewart, Judas Priest, Ozzy Osbourne, David Bowie, Tears For Fears, Anthrax and American soul singer Al Green as among her musical influences.

In her early teens, Jordan regularly sang and played guitar with a group of friends in Westmount Park. By the age of 16, Sass Jordan began performing with bands at clubs in downtown Montreal, eventually becoming a vocalist/bassist for high-profile local band The Pinups.

In 1986, Jordan made her recording debut on the Bündock album Mauve as co-lead vocalist on the song "Come On (Baby Tonight)". She soon began working as a session vocalist for other Montreal-based acts, notably for The Box. Jordan appeared as a vocalist in the music video for The Box song "Closer Together", although the vocals were recorded by Martine St. Clair. Local acts began recording songs written by Jordan, including the Canadian hit single "Rain" by Michael Breen, which was featured on his 1987 self-titled album.

Recording career
Jordan's debut album, Tell Somebody, was released in 1988 on Atlantic Records, featuring the Canadian chart hit singles "Tell Somebody", "Double Trouble", "Stranger Than Paradise", and "So Hard". "They played the "Tell Somebody" video on Much Music a lot," said Jordan. "I remember going in two weeks from relative obscurity to being recognized as the girl in the video." During the 1988–89 chart run of "So Hard", Jordan was also represented on the Canadian charts with her remake of the 1965 R&B classic "Rescue Me", which had been recorded for the soundtrack of the film American Boyfriends. As a result of her quick rise to fame, Jordan relocated from Montreal to Los Angeles in January 1990 to try breaking into the American music market.

Jordan's second album, Racine, was released in 1992 on MCA Records. Recorded in Los Angeles, Racine is Jordan's highest-selling album, with global sales estimated at 450,000 copies, and yielded the Canadian hit singles "Make You a Believer", "I Want to Believe", "You Don't Have to Remind Me" and "Goin’ Back Again". "Make You a Believer" and "I Want to Believe" were ranked on Billboard magazine's  Mainstream Rock chart. Racine has sold 100,000 copies in Canada.

In 1992, Jordan recorded the duet "Trust in Me" with  Joe Cocker for the motion picture The Bodyguard, after star Kevin Costner heard Jordan on his car radio. The soundtrack album for The Bodyguard would sell in excess of 45 million copies worldwide.

In 1994, Sass Jordan released Rats which she has cited as her favorite album. Rats yielded Jordan's first song on the Billboard Hot 100 with the single "Sun's Gonna Rise". However, Rats failed to build on the momentum of Racine, and Jordan subsequently was dropped from the MCA Records roster. Jordan then began recording for Aquarius Records, acquiescing to the label's request for a more mainstream sound for the albums Present (1997) and Hot Gossip (2000).  "Those are probably my least favourite records," says Jordan. "I think there are some great songs, I just don't like the production at all."

Sass Jordan's success as a judge on Canadian Idol encouraged her to return to recording in 2006, with the release of her album Get What You Give, recorded at the Nashville studio of Colin Linden, who served as producer. Guest artists on the album included bassist Garry Tallent (of Bruce Springsteen's E Street Band), drummers Ken Coomer (Uncle Tupelo, Wilco) and Bryan Owings (Shelby Lynne), guitarist Audley Freed (The Black Crowes) and keyboardist Richard Bell (The Band, Janis Joplin).

In 2009, Jordan entrusted her husband Derek Sharp with producing her album From Dusk 'til Dawn. The album was recorded in only three weeks and was mixed in Los Angeles. In discussing the songwriting for From Dusk ‘til Dawn, Jordan explained, "I was thinking about how human beings seem to be more sensitive and worried about things from sunset to sunrise. When you're alone is when the fear of death really hits you, and I was trying to write songs that were related to the fears of the middle of the night."

In 2011, Jordan recorded the studio project album S.U.N.: Something Unto Nothing featuring Brian Tichy and Michael Devin of Whitesnake, and Tommy Stewart. The album began when Jordan reunited with Tichy at his Santa Clarita home studio to write songs. Something Unto Nothing marked the first collaboration between Jordan and Tichy since Rats. "Burned" was the first song that Jordan and Tichy wrote together for the project, which soon evolved into a full album.

In 2017, 25 years after the release of Racine, Jordan recorded Racine Revisited featuring reimagined versions of the songs from the original 1992 album. "We pushed the sound back to the Misty Mountain Hop days of the 1970s and made it as if we were actually recording back then," said Jordan. "We would all live together in the studio and record live off the floor [without] Auto-Tune or click track or anything like that". Of the recording process, Sass Jordan said that Racine Revisited was "the most fun I’ve had in a while making a record." "Instead of taking Racine from 1992 to 2017, we went from 1992 to 1976".

In 2020, Sass Jordan released Rebel Moon Blues, her first blues album. Rebel Moon Blues features covers of blues classics, as well as the original "The Key". In discussing "The Key" on SXMCanadaNow, Jordan said, "That song was written about three weeks before we went into recording. Derek and I realized we should have at least one song that we wrote together on here, and so we came up with "The Key". The whole song came together in an hour. When it's meant to happen it really just flows out." Rebel Moon Blues was critically acclaimed upon release, with American Blues Scene writing, "After three decades in the business, many singers lose that certain something that may have launched their career. Not so with Sass Jordan. Not only is her voice as muscular as ever, I think, like fine wine, it's improved over the years." The album debuted at #5 on the Billboard Blues Album Chart.

Her latest album, Bitches Blues, featuring the song Still Alive and Well, was released on June 3, 2022.

Other projects

Sass Jordan has enjoyed a successful acting career in theatre and television. Jordan played the lead role of  Janis Joplin in the off-Broadway hit Love, Janis in 2001, and performed in the Toronto and Winnipeg productions of The Vagina Monologues. Jordan guest starred in the 1990s family-drama Sisters, which was her last television experience before joining Canadian Idol.

Sass Jordan served as a judge on all six seasons of Canadian Idol, beginning in 2003. In a bizarre twist of fate, Jordan had met Idol creator Simon Fuller twenty years before the launch of Canadian Idol when Fuller was managing English bands touring in Montreal. In 1981, a band that Fuller was managing had run out of money, and he ended up living in Sass Jordan's basement for two weeks. The Canadian Idol participants who Jordan is most fond of are Carly Rae Jepsen and Melissa O'Neil.

In 2019, Sass Jordan joined A Bowie Celebration: The David Bowie Alumni Tour. Led by Mike Garson, Bowie's keyboard player for forty years, the one-of-a-kind roving tribute to David Bowie features Bowie's past bandmates and has received wide acclaim. In discussing her involvement with the band, Jordan said, "I am extremely honored to be part of a show that celebrates the astonishing legacy of one of my ultimate idols, David Bowie, as well as getting to play with some of the master musicians from his bands. Bowie is one of the reasons I wanted to be a performer, and doing this tour is like playing a love letter to his memory every night!". Sass Jordan's first ever concert was David Bowie on his Diamond Dogs Tour.

Sass Jordan has ventured into the world of alcohol and spirits, with Rebel Moon Whiskey (a blended Canadian whisky by Dixon Distilleries) and Kick Ass Sass Wine (from Vineland Estates Winery in the Niagara Region). In discussing her branded lines of alcohol, Jordan said, "I am fascinated with the use of alcohol throughout history, in medicinal as well as gourmet types of approaches. It's also a wonderful companion to celebration, and I'm all about celebration - through music, through food, through dance, and art of all kinds!"

Personal life
Jordan is married to musician Derek Sharp, the current lead singer of The Guess Who. Together they have one daughter.

In the early 1990s, Sass Jordan toured with 22-year-old Taylor Hawkins, who later gained fame as the drummer of Foo Fighters. Of Jordan, Hawkins has said, "Sass taught me how to be in a rock and roll band and gave me my first rock and roll check." On July 9, 2015, Jordan was reunited with Hawkins when she joined Foo Fighters on stage in Toronto to cover "Stay With Me" by the Faces. Before the performance, Dave Grohl said, "If it weren't for Sass Jordan, Taylor Hawkins wouldn't be in Foo Fighters."

Sass Jordan is a vegetarian. "It's not an ethical thing," Jordan explained, "I don't think it will save the planet or anything, I just don't like meat."

Honours
Jordan was the recipient of the Juno award for Most Promising Female Vocalist of the Year in 1989, and was nominated for Best Female Vocalist in 1990, 1993, and 1995.

Billboard magazine listed Sass Jordan as the Top Female Rock Artist of the Year in 1992.

In 2012, Jordan was appointed honorary colonel of 417 Combat Support Squadron, an appointment she held until Glen Suitor's appointment in August 2016.

Discography

Studio albums

Singles

References

External links

SassJordan.com
 SomethingUntoNothing.com

1962 births
Living people
Canadian women rock singers
Canadian Idol
Canadian women singer-songwriters
English emigrants to Canada
Juno Award for Breakthrough Artist of the Year winners
Naturalized citizens of Canada
Singers from Montreal
Anglophone Quebec people
Musicians from Birmingham, West Midlands
20th-century Canadian women singers
21st-century Canadian women singers
Canadian blues singers